Thomas Anyan, D.D. was an Oxford college head.

Anyan was born in Kent and educated at Lincoln College, Oxford. He held the livings at Beckenham, Ashtead, Checkendon and Cranleigh. Anyan was President of Corpus Christi College, Oxford, from 1614 until 1629. He died at Canterbury in 1632.

References

1632 deaths
Alumni of Lincoln College, Oxford
Presidents of Corpus Christi College, Oxford
17th-century English Anglican priests